Sakhteman-e Kahiyar Darreh Bid (also Romanized as Sākhtemān-e Kahīyār Darreh Bīd) is a village in Chin Rural District, Ludab District, Boyer-Ahmad County, Kohgiluyeh and Boyer-Ahmad Province, Iran. At the 2006 census, its population was 72, in 21 families.

References 

Populated places in Boyer-Ahmad County